A Jatha (Punjabi: ਜੱਥਾ [sg]; ਜਥੇ [pl] ) is an armed body of Sikhs. They have existed in Sikh tradition since the beginning of the Khalsa (Sikh community) in 1699 CE. A Jatha basically means a group of people.

The Damdami Taksal Jatha
After the creation of the Khalsa, Guru Gobind Singh is said to have created the Damdami Taksal in 1706. Its first Jathedar (leader) was Baba Deep Singh who died at the age of 83 by having his head severed in a battle against Durrani forces.

Sikh Jatha during British rule
Jathas existed during the British Raj in the Punjab, northern India. During this time, the British imprisoned many Sikhs, Hindus and Muslims, and many villages and towns being raided by the British police. During these difficult times, Sikhs began forming jathas and new armed squads in British India, and many villages and towns relied on the protection of the Sikh jathas. Sikhs carried out many attacks and assassinations on the British, resulting in many Sikhs arrested and executed. The Sikhs played an influential role in the Indian independence movement. Prominent figures include Bhagat Singh and Udham Singh, who traveled to London and hunted down people who got away with the killings in India. Most Sikh prison inmates were executed after the assassination of the high ranking British officer John Simon, 1st Viscount Simon, head of the Simon Commission from the British Parliament. There was also a bombing targeting the British courts. Bhagat Singh was said to have been behind most of the actions carried out against the British and was later hanged.

Some Sikh jathas such as the Babbar Akali Movement, formed in 1921, rejected non-violence and gave stiff resistance to the British, which led to small battles and assassinations, and eventually by 1939 were down to large shootouts. When British rule came to an end in India, it had to make the crucial decision of determining the borders of the new country of Pakistan. Some historians say the biggest mistake the British made before they left India was splitting the Sikh main land of Punjab in two, giving one half to the Islamic government of Pakistan and the other half to be run by a Hindu government. This led to non-stop bloodshed between many Sikhs and Muslims. Thousands of Muslims fled the East Punjab for Pakistan and thousands of Sikhs left Pakistan to go to "New" Punjab, but this journey resulted in thousands of lives lost due to massacres committed by both sides.

See also 

 Violence against women during the partition of India

References

Sikh groups and sects
Religious paramilitary organizations